Gevar-e Olya (also Romanized as Gevar-e ‘Olyā; also known as Gevar, Gevar-e Bālā, and Givr) is a village in Gevar Rural District, Sarduiyeh District, Jiroft County, Kerman Province, Iran. At the 2006 census, its population was 440, in 126 families.

References 

Populated places in Jiroft County